The Assistant Secretary of State for Democracy, Human Rights, and Labor is the head of the Bureau of Democracy, Human Rights, and Labor within the United States Department of State.  The Assistant Secretary of State for Democracy, Human Rights, and Labor reports to the Under Secretary of State for Civilian Security, Democracy, and Human Rights.

List of Assistant Secretaries of State for Human Rights and Humanitarian Affairs, 1976—1993 

While Ernest W. Lefever was nominated for the office by Reagan in 1981, his nomination was rejected by the Senate Foreign Relations Committee and he withdrew from consideration.

List of Assistant Secretaries of State for Democracy, Human Rights, and Labor, 1993—Present

References

External links
History of Assistant Secretaries of State for Democracy, Human Rights, and Labor from the State Department Historian
Bureau of Democracy, Human Rights, and Labor Website

Human rights in the United States